The 1991 Halloween Havoc was the third annual Halloween Havoc professional wrestling pay-per-view (PPV) event produced by World Championship Wrestling (WCW). The event took place on October 27, 1991, from the UTC Arena in Chattanooga, Tennessee. This was also the first Halloween Havoc held by WCW alone following its split from the National Wrestling Alliance (NWA) in January 1991.

The main event was a two out of three falls match, in which Lex Luger defeated Ron Simmons to retain the WCW World Heavyweight Championship. Another major match at the event was a Chamber of Horrors match between the team of El Gigante, Sting, and The Steiner Brothers (Rick Steiner and Scott Steiner) and the team of Abdullah the Butcher, The Diamond Studd, Cactus Jack, and Big Van Vader. Additionally, Brian Pillman was crowned the inaugural WCW Light Heavyweight Champion at the event by defeating Richard Morton in the finals of a tournament.

In 2014, all of WCW's Halloween Havoc PPVs became available on WWE's streaming service, the WWE Network.

Production

Background
Halloween Havoc was an annual professional wrestling pay-per-view event produced by World Championship Wrestling (WCW) since 1989. As the name implies, it was a Halloween-themed show held in October. The 1991 event was the third event in the Halloween Havoc chronology and it took place on October 27, 1991, from the UTC Arena in Chattanooga, Tennessee. This was also the first Halloween Havoc held by WCW alone following its split from the National Wrestling Alliance (NWA) in January 1991.

Storylines
The event featured wrestlers from pre-existing scripted feuds and storylines. Wrestlers portrayed villains, heroes, or less distinguishable characters in the scripted events that built tension and culminated in a wrestling match or series of matches.

Event

During the pre-show, Barry Windham was attacked by Arn Anderson and Larry Zbyszko and suffered a broken hand when they slammed his hand in a car door.  In the opening match, Sting's team won after Cactus Jack accidentally pulled the switch while Abdullah the Butcher was in the electric chair. Originally, the match was supposed to feature El Gigante, Sting, and the Steiner Brothers against Oz, the Diamond Studd, the One Man Gang, and Barry Windham. Cactus replaced Oz, Big Van Vader replaced Windham, and Abdullah replaced Gang. One Man Gang was scheduled to take part in this match, but left WCW before the show. With Cactus Jack in the opening match, Oz replaced him against Bill Kazmaier. Doug Somers replaced the injured Michael Hayes, who was originally scheduled for the match against Van Hammer. The Phantom later revealed himself to be Rick Rude.

United States Tag Team Champions The Patriots challenged the Enforcers for the WCW World Tag Team Championship. The U.S. Tag Team Championships were not on the line.

This event also featured two matches utilizing the Refer-eye camera, where the referee wore a helmet with a camera to capture the action the referee sees.

Results

Tournament brackets

Aftermath
As a result of the attack by The Enforcers at the beginning of the show, a match was scheduled for Clash of the Champions XVII against Barry Windham and Dustin Rhodes even though Windham was not cleared to wrestle. This would lead to the return of Ricky Steamboat as Dustin’s partner.

Rick Rude made a challenge to Sting during his debut promo. A match between the two would also take place at the Clash.

This marked the PPV return of "Ravishing" Rick Rude, who left WCW's predecessor company Jim Crockett Promotions for the WWF in 1987 whilst World Tag Team champions with Manny Fernandez. Rude left WWF earlier in 1991 after a four year run.  Kevin Nash would later shed the "Oz" gimmick and become "Vinnie Vegas".  Brian Pillman would lose the Light Heavyweight title to Japanese star Jushin Thunder Liger later in 1991 before regaining it in a classic match at SuperBrawl II.  Lex Luger (due to his contract only requiring him to work a certain number of dates) would not defend the WCW World Title on PPVs until SuperBrawl II in his final WCW match (before leaving for the World Bodybuilding Federation), losing to Sting (he did defend the title on the WCW/New Japan Supershow II in January 1992 against Masahiro Chono but it did not air in the US until March.)

References

1991 in professional wrestling
Halloween Havoc
1991 in Tennessee
Events in Tennessee
Professional wrestling in Tennessee
1991 World Championship Wrestling pay-per-view events
Holidays themed professional wrestling events